Mohammad Usman (1912–1948) was an Indian army officer.

Mohammad or Muhammad Usman may also refer to:
 Mohammad Usman of Madras (1884–1960), Indian politician and socialite
 Mohammad Usman (politician), Pakistani politician
 Mohammad Usman Rana (born 1985), Norwegian-Pakistani commentator and columnist
 Muhammed Usman Edu (born 1994), Nigerian footballer
 Muhammad Usman (cricketer) (born 1985), cricketer from United Arab Emirates
 Muhammad Usman (field hockey) (born 1971), Pakistani field hockey player

See also
 Mohammed Usman (disambiguation)